A pipe bomb is an improvised explosive device which uses a tightly sealed section of pipe filled with an explosive material. The containment provided by the pipe means that simple low explosives can be used to produce a relatively huge explosion due to the containment causing increased pressure, and the fragmentation of the pipe itself creates potentially lethal shrapnel.

Premature detonation is a hazard of attempting to construct any homemade bomb, and the materials and methods used with pipe bombs make unintentional detonation incidents common, usually resulting in serious injury or death to the assembler.

In many countries, the manufacture or possession of a pipe bomb is a serious crime, regardless of its intended use.

Design

The bomb is usually a short section of steel water pipe containing the explosive mixture and closed at both ends with steel or brass caps. A fuse is inserted into the pipe with a lead running out through a hole in the side or capped end of the pipe. The fuse can be electric, with wires leading to a timer and battery, or can be a common fuse. All of the components are easily obtainable. 

Generally, high explosives such as TNT are not used, because these and the detonators that they require are difficult for non-state users to obtain. Such explosives also do not require the containment design of a pipe bomb. 

Instead, explosive mixtures that the builder can more readily obtain themselves are used, such as gunpowder, match heads, or chlorate mixtures. These can be easily ignited by friction, static electricity, and sparks generated when packing the material inside the tube or attaching the end caps, causing many injuries or deaths amongst builders. 

Sharp objects such as nails or broken glass are sometimes added to the outer shell or inside of the bomb to increase potential injury, damage, and death.

Operation
Pipe bombs concentrate pressure and release it suddenly, through the failure of the outer casing. Plastic materials can be used, but metals typically have a much higher bursting strength and so will produce more concussive force.

The pipe can rupture in different ways, depending on the rate of pressure rise and the ductility of the casing material.
If the pressure rise is slow, the metal can deform until the walls become thin and a hole is formed, causing a loud report from the gas release, but no shrapnel.
A rapid rate of pressure rise will cause the metal to shatter into fragments, which are pushed outward in all directions by the expanding gases.

Modes of failure
Pipe bombs can fail to explode if the gas pressure buildup is too slow, resulting in bleed-out through the detonator ignition hole. Insufficiently tight threading can also bleed gas pressure through the threads faster than the chemical reaction pressure can rise.

They can also fail if the pipe is fully sealed and the chemical reaction triggered, but the total pressure buildup from the chemicals is insufficient to exceed the casing strength; such a bomb is a dud, but still potentially dangerous if handled, since an external shock could trigger rupture of the statically pressurized casing.

Minimum evacuation distances
If any type of bomb is suspected, typical recommendations are to keep all people at a minimum evacuation distance until authorized bomb disposal personnel arrive.

Uses
Pipe bombs are by nature improvised weapons and typically used by those without access to military devices such as grenades. They were successfully used in the Spanish Civil War (1936–1939). During World War II, members of the British Home Guard were trained to make and use them.

In Northern Ireland, there have been hundreds of pipe bomb attacks since the mid-1990s as the Troubles came to an end. Most of the attacks have been launched by loyalist paramilitaries, especially the Red Hand Defenders, Orange Volunteers and Ulster Defence Association. However, they have also been used by Irish republican paramilitaries and by anti-drugs vigilante group Republican Action Against Drugs. They are also used extensively in the south of Ireland by feuding criminals, including drug dealers, mainly in the capital city of Dublin.

As well as users such as criminals, paramilitaries, and militias, they also have a long tradition of recreational use for amusement or mischief with no intention to cause injury to anyone, but due to the dangers of premature ignition and of shrapnel, pipe bombs are much more dangerous than alternatives such as dry ice bombs or potato cannons.

Notable incidents

On 4 May 1886, a pipe bomb was thrown during a rally at Haymarket Square in Chicago, Illinois, United States. It reached a police line and exploded, killing policeman Mathias J. Degan. The bomb was made from gas-pipe filled with dynamite and capped at both ends with wooden blocks.
From August 1977 to November 1977 Allan Steen Kristensen planted several bombs across Copenhagen, Denmark injuring 5 but killing no one.
 In 1985, Palestinian American anti-discrimination activist Alex Odeh was killed in California by a pipe-bomb. Activists from the Jewish Defense League are suspected of being the bombers.
On December 16, 1989, Federal Judge Robert Vance was assassinated in his home in Mountain Brook, Alabama when he opened a package that contained a pipe bomb mailed by Walter Leroy Moody in Mountain Brook, Alabama.
On 27 July 1996, Eric Rudolph used a pipe bomb in the Centennial Olympic Park bombing during the 1996 Summer Olympics in Atlanta, Georgia, United States. It killed two people and injured 111.
During the preparation of the Columbine High School Massacre, Eric Harris and Dylan Klebold had experimented with pipe bombs. During their testing and experimentation, Eric Harris had posted their results on his website. During the massacre, Harris and Klebold had used their pipe bombs as makeshift hand grenades, alongside various other bombs they had crudely manufactured.
On 11 December 2010 a suicide bomber detonated one out of six pipe bombs close to a major shopping district in Stockholm, Sweden, killing himself with no other casualties in what is known as the 2010 Stockholm bombings.

In October 2018, pipe bombs without triggering devices were sent to various liberal and political figures in the United States. Recipients included political activist and investor George Soros, former Secretary of State Hillary Clinton, former President Barack Obama, former CIA Director John Brennan, and former Attorney General Eric Holder.
On 6 January 2021, a pipe bomb was found at the headquarters of the Republican National Committee, during the certification of President-elect Joe Biden. An unidentified object was also found at the headquarters of the Democratic National Committee, resulting in an evacuation.

See also 

 Improvised explosive device
 TM 31-210 Improvised Munitions Handbook

References

–Apparatus and method for disarming pipe bombs

Improvised explosive devices
Insurgency weapons